Denzil Doyle C.M. is an electrical engineer and entrepreneur.

Career
He has become a  prominent figure in the Ottawa technology community having been the "founding president of Digital Equipment Corporation's Canadian subsidiary, one of the region's early high tech leaders. He ran the company for 18 years, during which annual sales reached $160 million." In his role with DEC he is especially notable for having brought together Canadian nuclear scientists with American DEC personnel to create the computers that evolved into the highly successful PDP-8 machines. Doyle is the Founder and Chairman of Doyletech Corporation, has been its President since November 1982. He is a Member of the Order of Canada.

References

Living people
Members of the Order of Canada
Canadian business executives
Year of birth missing (living people)